"Lhotsky/Blackhouse" is an aboriginal Tasmanian language identified in the reconstructions of Claire Bowern. It was presumably spoken somewhere in the northeast of Tasmania, but the original location of the speakers was not recorded. 

The language has no name; "Lhotsky/Blackhouse" is a label based on the names of people associated with various word lists. Bowern finds several word lists that attest to this previously unidentified language: The "eastern" list of Jorgen Jorgenson (in one case published in 1846), 345 words, along with a second list of 68 words; manuscripts of James Backhouse and G.W. Walker, 148 words combined; and a 105-word list of Alexander McGeary, published by John Lhotsky in 1839.

References

Northeastern Tasmanian languages